Aishwarya Rajesh (born 10 January 1990) is an Indian actress who works primarily in Tamil films, alongside Telugu and Malayalam films. She is a recipient of four SIIMA Awards, one Filmfare Award South and one Tamil Nadu State Film Award.

Aishwarya started her career as television presenter in a comedy show called Asatha Povathu Yaaru? on Sun TV. After winning the reality show Maanada Mayilada, she was cast in the film Avargalum Ivargalum (2011) and came into prominence after starring in Attakathi (2012) portraying the role of Amudha. She has received Tamil Nadu State Film Award for Best Actress for the 2014 film Kaaka Muttai at Tamil Nadu State Film Awards. She acted in her two career breakthrough roles as Padma in Vetrimaran's Vada Chennai (2018) co-starring with Dhanush and as Kousalya Murugesan, a female cricketer in her solo film Kanaa (2018).

Her first Malayalam film was Jomonte Suvisheshangal (2017) opposite Dulquer Salmaan. She made her Hindi film debut in 2017 with Daddy opposite to Arjun Rampal. She made her Telugu film debut with Kousalya Krishnamurthy (2019), which was a remake of her 2018 movie, Kanaa.

Early life

Aishwarya Rajesh was born on 10 January 1990 in a Telugu family in Chennai (then Madras). Her father Rajesh was a Telugu film actor. He died when Aishwarya was 8 years old. Her mother Nagamani was a dancer. Her grandfather Amarnath was also an actor, while her aunt Sri Lakshmi, is a Telugu comedian with over 500 films to her credit. She is the youngest of four siblings, of whom two elder brothers died during her teenage years.

Aishwarya was brought up in Chennai, and she described her background as "lower middle class." She did her schooling in Shrine Vailankanni, Chennai, Sree Vidyanikethan International School, Tirupati, and Holy Angels Anglo Indian Higher Secondary School, Chennai. In 1996, she performed as a child in the Telugu film Rambantu.

She studied at Ethiraj College for Women, Chennai and graduated with a B.Com degree. She started to learn dance since she needed to choreograph a stage show for a student cultural fest and later entered the reality show Maanada Mayilada on Kalaignar TV. She won the show's third season and got offered roles in films thereafter.

Career

2010–2015 
In the early stages of her career, Aishwarya also worked as an anchor on the sets of the TV show Asathapovathu Yaaru. In 2010, she was cast in her first film Avargalum Ivargalum (2011) although Neethana Avan (2010) released first. In 2014, she was seen alongside Vijay Sethupathi in two films, Rummy, and Pannaiyarum Padminiyum, released within two weeks. While the first film was a village drama set in the 1980s, the latter was based on a short film of the same name, and revolved around an old man and his vintage car Premier Padmini. Critics praised her performances, especially in Rummy. Hindustan Times wrote that she was "extremely promising" while film critic Baradwaj Rangan noted that she was "expressive", calling her "a tonic for nerves frayed by the alabaster automatons we usually get as heroines". Later that year, she appeared in a song sequence in R. Parthiepan's Kathai Thiraikathai Vasanam Iyakkam and as the female lead in Thirudan Police. In April 2014, she began filming for Seenu Ramasamy's Idam Porul Yaeval, but the film remains unreleased as of May 2020.

Her first release in 2015 was Kaaka Muttai. Initially, she was very hesitant to play a mother role at such an early stage in her career, but, after seeking advice from her Pannaiyarum Padminiyum co-star Vijay Sethupathi and after gaining interest in the script herself, she decided to be part of the film. Her portrayal of a slum dweller and mother of two children was lauded unanimously by critics and is regarded as one of "100 Greatest Performances of the Decade" by Film Companion. Critic Baradwaj Rangan wrote, "it features stunning performances from everyone...especially Aishwarya Rajesh, who plays the kids' mother with a world-weariness that belies her years". Other reviewers stated that she was "excellent", played her role "with extraordinary ease" and that she "leaves you awe-struck". That year, she also made her stage debut, playing Cinderella from the same-titled fairytale that was adapted as a "musical dance drama".

2016–present 
Aishwarya had the most releases for a Tamil actress in 2016 with 8 films out of which Aarathu Sinam, Hello Naan Pei Pesuren, Manithan and Dharma Durai were commercially successful. She was critically appreciated for her performance in the films Dharma Durai and Kuttrame Thandanai, where she collaborated with Kaaka Muttai director Manikandan. She became the number one choice for acting in performance oriented roles in the industry. In 2017, Aishwarya made her entry in Malayalam films acting in two commercially and critically successful films Jomonte Suvisheshangal and Sakhhavu. Based on her performance in Kaaka Muttai, Arjun Rampal selected Aishwarya in the role of Zubeida for the film Daddy. With this, Aishwarya made her debut in Hindi and was recognized for her performance in her first Hindi film. In 2018, she completed shooting for Idhu Vedhalam Sollum Kathai. The film remained unreleased as of April 2020.

She starred in her solo film as a cricketer in Kanaa under Sivakarthikeyan's production. She reprised her role in the Telugu remake Kousalya Krishnamurthy, which marked her lead Telugu debut. She starred in sister roles in Namma Veettu Pillai and Vaanam Kottatum. She played a village belle in World Famous Lover. She played a woman who lost her husband in Dubai in Ka Pae Ranasingam.  Regarding her performance, a critic noted that "Aishwarya Rajesh is a revelation. She displays hopelessness, powerlessness, vulnerability, grit and determination with ease and impressive conviction".

Subsequently, she performed in leading roles such as Thittam Irandu (2021), Boomika (2021) and Driver Jamuna (2022). The action thriller, Run Baby Run (2023) with RJ Balaji has received positive response. While, The Great Indian Kitchen (2023), Aishwarya Rajesh saves the Tamil remake of the brilliant family drama.

Filmography

Film

Dubbing artist

Television

Music video

Awards and nominations

References

External links 
 
 

1990 births
Living people
Actresses from Chennai
Indian film actresses
Indian web series actresses
Actresses in Telugu cinema
Actresses in Tamil cinema
Actresses in Malayalam cinema
Actresses in Hindi cinema
Telugu actresses
South Indian International Movie Awards winners
Tamil Nadu State Film Awards winners
Filmfare Awards South winners
21st-century Indian actresses